John Wort Hannam is a Canadian folk musician, from Fort Macleod, Alberta. He is known for his story telling through music. Themes which are central to his music include life in Western Canada, and the human experience as seen through the eyes of working folk.

Early life
Hannam was born in Jersey, Channel Islands.

Career
Hannam was a full-time public school teacher until 2000.  He has performed at festivals in Canada, the United States, Great Britain and Australia and he appeared at the 2006 Smithsonian Folklife Festival in Washington, D.C.  In addition to singing, John plays guitar, tenor guitar and harmonica.

In 2010 Hannam as presented with a Canadian Folk Music Award.

Awards
2007 New Folk Winner Kerrville Folk Festival
2007 Songwriting Competition Calgary Folk Music Festival
2006 Best Performance Calgary Folk Music Festival
2005 CBC Galaxie Rising Star Award Edmonton Folk Music Festival
2005 NCRA 2005 Dig Your Roots Songwriting Competition.
2004 Songwriting Competition Calgary Folk Music Festival

Discography
Queen's Hotel Sept. 15, 2009. Released on independent label Black Hen Music
Two Bit Suit April 10, 2007.  Released on independent label Black Hen Music
Dynamite and ‘dozers. June 16, 2004
Pocket full of holes. July 17, 2002

References

External links

John Wort Hannam's MySpace

Black Hen Music artists
Canadian folk guitarists
Canadian male guitarists
Canadian folk singer-songwriters
Canadian male singer-songwriters
Jersey emigrants to Canada
Jersey musicians
Living people
People from Saint Helier
Canadian Folk Music Award winners
Year of birth missing (living people)